Šumperk District(German: Bezirk Mährisch Schönberg) is a district (okres) within the Olomouc Region of the Czech Republic Its administrative centre is the town of Šumperk.

Šumperk District shares border with the districts of Olomouc (to the south), Svitavy District (to the south-west), Ústí nad Orlicí District (to the north-west), Polish Kłodzko County (to the north), Jeseník District (to the north-east) and Bruntál District (to the east).

Geography
Šumperk District is a part of Moravia, except an area around Malá Morava village and Štíty town, which belong to Bohemia. 
The highest point is the Praděd mountain (1492 meters) situated on a north, the lowest point is a floodplain of Morava river (339 meters) south of Loštice town.

District's surface is mostly mountainous and hilly. Wide lowland of Mohelnická brázda depression is situated in the center and most population lives there.

Demography
According to 2011 census, Šumperk District had 126 567 inhabitants. The district has currently around 120,000 inhabitants. Most populated towns are Šumperk, Zábřeh and Mohelnice.

Nationalities
Czech 89,1% 
Moravian 6,4%
Slovak 1,5%
Polish 0,2% 
German 0,4% 
Roma 0,1%

Citizenships
Czech Republic 125,773 people (99,37%)
Poland 162 people (0,13%)
Slovakia 188 people (0,15%)
Ukraine 108 people	(0,09%)
Vietnam 69 people (0,05%)

Confessions
believer 35,1% 
atheist 56,1% 
no data 8,8%

Geology
Most rocks are metamorphic and igneous. The district has several deposits of minerals.

Area – mineral

Sobotín, Krásné – crystals of albite, epidote, titanite 
Bludov – bludovite (special kind of wollastonite) 
Abandoned mines near Sobotín – actinolite, amphibole, asbestos and magnetite crystals
Petrov nad Desnou – staurolite crystals 
Maršíkov – beryl, chrysoberyl, columbite, topaz and zircon.

List of municipalities
Bludov -
Bohdíkov -
Bohuslavice -
Bohutín -
Branná -
Bratrušov -
Brníčko -
Bušín -
Chromeč -
Dlouhomilov -
Dolní Studénky -
Drozdov -
Dubicko -
Hanušovice -
Horní Studénky -
Hoštejn -
Hraběšice -
Hrabišín -
Hrabová -
Hynčina -
Jakubovice -
Janoušov -
Jedlí -
Jestřebí -
Jindřichov -
Kamenná -
Klopina -
Kolšov -
Kopřivná -
Kosov -
Krchleby -
Lesnice -
Leština -
Libina -
Líšnice -
Loštice -
Loučná nad Desnou -
Lukavice -
Malá Morava -
Maletín -
Mírov -
Mohelnice -
Moravičany -
Nemile -
Nový Malín -
Olšany -
Oskava -
Palonín -
Pavlov -
Petrov nad Desnou -
Písařov -
Police -
Postřelmov -
Postřelmůvek -
Rájec -
Rapotín -
Rejchartice -
Rohle -
Rovensko -
Ruda nad Moravou -
Šléglov -
Sobotín -
Staré Město -
Stavenice -
Štíty -
Sudkov -
Šumperk -
Svébohov -
Třeština -
Úsov -
Velké Losiny -
Vernířovice -
Vikantice -
Vikýřovice -
Vyšehoří -
Zábřeh -
Zborov -
Zvole

References

 
Districts of the Czech Republic